The Gaulstown Portal Tomb or Gaulstown Dolmen is a megalithic portal tomb situated in Gaulstown, Butlerstown in County Waterford in the Republic of Ireland. It lies about 7 km south west of Waterford City.

Location
The tomb is named for the townsland in which it situated, Gaulstown, and sits at the foot of "Cnoc an Chaillighe" or "The Hill of the Hag".

Features
The portal tomb most likely dates from around 3500 BC, and is considered one of the finest examples of portal tombs in the region, and was first recorded by George Victor Du Noyer in 1864. The tomb has been undergone maintenance in the past, with a concrete support added inside the chamber. There is evidence that some of the upright stones may have moved over time, as the shape of the chamber has been impacted. It is likely that the structure was once enclosed by a mound or cairn, which has since been removed or eroded away.

See also

List of largest monoliths in the world

References

External links

Discover Ireland

Archaeological sites in County Waterford
Buildings and structures in County Waterford
Dolmens in Ireland
National Monuments in County Waterford
Tombs in the Republic of Ireland